Phryganidia is a genus of moths of the family Notodontidae. It consists of the following species:
Phryganidia californica Packard, 1864
Phryganidia naxa (Druce, 1887)
Phryganidia chihuahua Miller, 1987

Notodontidae